Glipa ogasawarensis is a species of beetle in the genus Glipa. It was described in 1928.

References

ogasawarensis
Beetles described in 1928
Taxa named by Hiromichi Kono